VME may refer to:

Computing
 ICL VME, (Virtual Machine Environment) a mainframe computer operating system developed by International Computers Limited
 VMEbus, the ANSI/IEEE computer hardware bus standard
 Virtual machine escape is the process of breaking out of a virtual machine and interacting with the host operating system
 Virtual Mode Extensions, an undocumented extension of the Intel Pentium in v86 mode, "Virtual 8086 Mode Enhancements" in later Intel processors
 vme, a flag in a modern x86 CPU indicating support of Virtual 8086 mode
 VME (CONFIG.SYS directive), a configuration directive under OS/2

Other uses
 V-me, a Spanish-language TV network in the United States
 Voices Music & Entertainment, a Norwegian record label